Peoria High School is the name of multiple secondary schools in the United States:

 Peoria High School (Arizona), in Peoria, Arizona
 Peoria High School (Peoria, Illinois), in Peoria, Illinois — also known as Central

See also
 East Peoria Community High School, in East Peoria, Illinois
 Peoria Accelerated High School, in Peoria, Arizona
 Peoria Heights High School, in Peoria Heights, Illinois
 Peoria Notre Dame High School, in Peoria, Illinois